Gerald J. Prince (born November 7, 1942 in Alexandria, Egypt) is an American academic and literary theoretician. He is Professor of Romance Languages at the University of Pennsylvania, where he is also affiliated with department of Linguistics and the Program in Comparative Literature, and with the Annenberg School for Communication. 

Prince received his Ph.D. from Brown University (1968). He is a leading scholar of narrative poetics, and has helped to shape the discipline of narratology, developing key concepts such as the narratee, narrativity, the disnarrated, and narrative grammar. In addition to his theoretical work, he is a distinguished critic of contemporary French literature, and is regarded as an authority on the French novel of the twentieth century. 

Prince's writings in French and English have been translated into many other languages, and he has been a Visiting Professor at universities in France, Belgium, Italy, Australia, and Canada, as well as the United States. He is the General Editor of the "Stages" series at the University of Nebraska Press, and he serves on more than a dozen other editorial and advisory boards. In 2013 he received the Wayne C. Booth Lifetime Achievement Award from the International Society for the Study of Narrative, an organization that he presided in 2007.

Bibliography

Métaphysique et technique dans l'oeuvre romanesque de Sartre. Geneva: Droz, 1968.
A Grammar of Stories. Berlin: Mouton, 1973.
Narratology: The Form and Functioning of Narrative. Berlin: Mouton, 1982.
A Dictionary of Narratology. Lincoln: University of Nebraska Press, 1987.
Narrative as Theme: Studies in French Fiction. Lincoln: University of Nebraska Press, 1992.
Alteratives. Co-edited with Warren Motte. Lexington: French Forum, 1993.
Autobiography, Historiography, and Rhetoric. Co-edited with Mary Donaldson-Evans and Lucienne Frappier-Mazur. Amsterdam: Rodopi, 1994.
Corps/Décors: Femmes, Orgies, Parodies.  Co-edited with Catherine Nesci and Gretchen Van Slyke. Amsterdam: Rodopi, 1999.
Eroticisms/Érotismes. Co-edited with Roger Célestin and Éliane DalMolin. Special issue of Sites, vol. 6, no. 1, 2002.
Guide du roman de langue française (1901-1950). Lanham: University Press of America, 2002.
Résurgence/Oubli.  Co-edited with Sabrinelle Bedrane and Bruno Blanckeman. Special issue of French Forum, vol. 41. no. 1-2, 2016. 
Geographical Narratology (special issue of Frontiers of Narrative Studies, vol. 4, no. 2, 2018. 
Guide du roman de langue française (1951-2000). Paris: Vérone, 2019.

References

Further reading
 Vincent B. Leitch, American Literary Criticism from the Thirties to the Eighties. New York: Columbia UP, 1988, pp. 248–49.
 Irena Makaryk, ed., Encyclopedia of Contemporary Literary Theory. Toronto: U of Toronto Press, 1993, pp. 448–49.

1942 births
Living people
American literary theorists
University of Pennsylvania faculty